Hashemabad Air Force Base ( – Pāygāh Padāfand Havā’ī-ye Hāshemābād) is a village and military installation in Tudeshk Rural District, Kuhpayeh District, Isfahan County, Isfahan Province, Iran. At the 2006 census, its population was 503, in 172 families.

References 

Populated places in Isfahan County
Military installations of Iran
Iranian airbases